The 1840 United States presidential election in Virginia took place between October 30 and December 2, 1840, as part of the 1840 United States presidential election. Voters chose 23 representatives, or electors to the Electoral College, who voted for President and Vice President.

Virginia voted for the Democratic candidate, incumbent President Martin Van Buren, over Whig candidate William Henry Harrison. Van Buren narrowly won Virginia by a margin of 1.3%, or 1,120 votes.

Results

References

Virginia
1840
1840 Virginia elections